Events from the year 1907 in Scotland.

Incumbents 

 Secretary for Scotland and Keeper of the Great Seal – John Sinclair

Law officers 
 Lord Advocate – Thomas Shaw
 Solicitor General for Scotland – Alexander Ure

Judiciary 
 Lord President of the Court of Session and Lord Justice General – Lord Dunedin
 Lord Justice Clerk – Lord Kingsburgh

Events 
 5 February – epidemic of meningitis in Glasgow, Edinburgh and Belfast
 24 April – Titan Clydebank crane first operates at John Brown & Company's shipyard
 24 August – last horse trams in Edinburgh operate
 18 September – Andrew Carnegie receives the freedom of Burntisland
 New Ayr Racecourse opens
 Edinburgh College of Art gains its present name and site
 The Moine Thrust Belt in the Scottish Highlands is identified, one of the first to be discovered
 Scottish wildcat first scientifically classified
 Limited Partnership Act regulates Scottish limited partnerships

Births 
 2 January – Robert Wilson, tenor (died 1964)
 4 January – Walter Donaldson, snooker player (died 1973 in England)
 28 January – Robert McLellan, playwright (died 1985)
 4 February – James McIntosh Patrick, landscape painter (died 1998)
 16 April – Martin Boddey, film and television actor (died 1975 in London)
 22 May – Huw Lorimer, sculptor (died 1993)
 13 August – Sir Basil Spence, architect (died 1976 in Yaxley, Suffolk)
 28 August – Tom Hanlin, novelist (died 1953)
 2 October – Alexander R. Todd, Baron Todd, biochemist, winner of the Nobel Prize in Chemistry (died 1997 in England)
 7 October – Helen MacInnes, espionage novelist (died 1985 in the United States)
 4 November – Ferguson Rodger, physician (died 1978)
 5 December – William Barclay, Professor of Divinity (died 1978)
 25 December – Andrew Cruickshank, actor (died 1988 in England)
 Jameson Clark, character actor (died 1984)
 Dr Catherine Gavin, academic historian, war correspondent and historical novelist (died 2000)
 Betty Henderson, actress (died 1979)

Deaths 
 21 January – John Hunt, cleric, theologian and historian (born 1829)
 4 April – Alexander Macbain, philologist (born 1855)
 13 May – Alexander Buchan, meteorologist oceanographer and botanist (born 1827)  
 19 July – William Gunion Rutherford, classicist (born 1853)
 30 August – James Adam, classicist (born 1860)
 6 October – David Masson, literary critic and historian (born 1822)
 4 November – Rev. Dr. Robert Blair, minister of religion and Gaelic scholar (born 1837)
 6 November – James Hector, geologist, naturalist and surgeon (born 1834)
 17 December – William Thomson, 1st Baron Kelvin, physicist (born 1824 in Ireland)
 Jane Arthur, feminist and activist (born 1827)

See also 
 Timeline of Scottish history
 1907 in the United Kingdom

References 

 
Scotland
Years of the 20th century in Scotland
1900s in Scotland